Thank You Maa was an Indian television special episode which aired on Star Plus on 10 May 2015 at 6 PM IST, Mother's Day. The special episode was produced by Balaji Telefilms. The episode starred popular Bollywood actor, Ranveer Singh and many other Bollywood actors and actresses.

Thank You Maa was dedicated to all the mothers for all their love, and also featured performances by Bollywood celebrities like Shakti Mohan, Sanjeeda Sheikh, Gurmeet Choudhary, Aditya Narayan, Aditi Sharma, Salman Yusuff Khan among others.

Cast
Karan Singh Grover
Shakti Mohan
Sanjeeda Sheikh
Gurmeet Choudhary
Aditya Narayan
Aditi Sharma
Salman Yusuff Khan

References

2015 Indian television series debuts
Hindi-language television shows
Television shows set in Mumbai
StarPlus original programming